Armardeh (also Romanized as Ārmardeh and Armadeh; also known as Armado and Armordah) is a city and capital of Alut District, in Baneh County, Kurdistan Province, Iran. At the 2006 census, its population was 2,062, in 427 families. The city is populated by Kurds.

References

Towns and villages in Baneh County
Cities in Kurdistan Province
Kurdish settlements in Kurdistan Province